Clube de Rugby de Évora is a rugby union team based in Évora, Portugal. In the 2016/17 season, they played in the First Division of the Campeonato Português de Rugby. (National Championship).

External links
Clube de Rugby de Évora

Portuguese rugby union teams
Rugby clubs established in 1992
1992 establishments in Portugal
Évora